Royal crown may refer to

 A crown (headgear), a traditional symbolic form of head adornment worn by a monarch.
 Royal Crown Cola, an American brand of cola-flavored soft drink.